Paul Dobson (born May 30, 1979 in Saint John, New Brunswick) is a Canadian curler from Quispamsis, New Brunswick. He currently plays second for Team James Grattan.

Career
Dobson won his first New Brunswick Tankard in 2005 as second for Wade Blanchard. They defeated Russ Howard in the final. They finished in eleventh place at the 2005 Tim Hortons Brier with a 3–8 record. The following season, he began skipping his own team with Scott Jones, Ryan Porter and Pierre Fraser. The team won the 2007 New Brunswick Labatt Tankard, defeating Howard in the provincial final, and finished last at the 2007 Tim Hortons Brier only able to win one of eleven games. Dobson continued to play in the provincial men's championship but failed to win from 2008–2019. He joined the James Grattan rink for the 2019–20 season. On the tour, they picked up a win at the Jim Sullivan Curling Classic and played in the 2019 Tour Challenge Tier 2, finishing 1–3. Later that season, the team won the 2020 New Brunswick Tankard and represented New Brunswick at the 2020 Tim Hortons Brier in Kingston, Ontario. After starting 1–2, they upset higher seeds Ontario's John Epping and British Columbia's Steve Laycock to sit in a good spot going into their final two games. Unfortunately, they would lose both of those games, finishing the round robin at 3–4, missing the playoffs.

Due to the COVID-19 pandemic in New Brunswick, the 2021 provincial championship was cancelled. As the reigning provincial champions, Team Grattan was invited to represent New Brunswick at the 2021 Tim Hortons Brier, which they accepted. Dobson, however, opted not to attend the event due to travel restrictions. He was replaced by Jonathan Beuk of Ontario. At the Brier, his team finished with a 4–4 record.

Personal life
Dobson is married and has two children, Chloe and Elyse. He works in operations at Irving Paper.

Teams

References

External links

Curlers from New Brunswick
Living people
Sportspeople from Saint John, New Brunswick
1979 births
Canadian male curlers
People from Kings County, New Brunswick